Sandlane is the westernmost town in Eswatini. It is located close to the border with South Africa, 40 kilometres southwest of the capital, Mbabane.

References
Fitzpatrick, M., Blond, B., Pitcher, G., Richmond, S., and Warren, M. (2004)  South Africa, Lesotho and Swaziland. Footscray, VIC: Lonely Planet.

Populated places in Eswatini
Eswatini–South Africa border crossings